Charge 'n Blast is a video game developed by Sims for Dreamcast in 2000.

Reception

The game received "average" reviews according to the review aggregation website Metacritic. Jeff Lundrigan of NextGen said of the game, "If you've got a lot of patience or superhuman hand-eye coordination, by all means give it a try. Otherwise, this wears thin quickly." In Japan, Famitsu gave it a score of 26 out of 40.

References

External links
 

2000 video games
CRI Middleware games
Dreamcast games
Dreamcast-only games
Multiplayer and single-player video games
Sega video games
Shooter video games
Video games about mecha
Video games developed in Japan
Xicat Interactive games